The short-winged cisticola (Cisticola brachypterus), also known as the siffling cisticola, is a species of bird in the family Cisticolidae.  It is found in Angola, Benin, Burkina Faso, Burundi, Cameroon, Central African Republic, Chad, Republic of the Congo, Democratic Republic of the Congo, Ivory Coast, Eritrea, Ethiopia, Gabon, Gambia, Ghana, Guinea, Guinea-Bissau, Kenya, Liberia, Malawi, Mali, Mozambique, Niger, Nigeria, Rwanda, Senegal, Sierra Leone, Somalia, South Sudan, Tanzania, Togo, Uganda, Zambia, and Zimbabwe.

The short-winged cisticola resembles the neddicky, a similar member of the genus Cisticola, but lacks the rufous crown with a shorter tail and clear buff underparts.

Habitat
It is widespread across sub-Saharan Africa, occurring from west Africa to Ethiopia and south to southern Mozambique. Here it is locally common in clearings in woodland, especially miombo (Brachystegia) but also other types of savanna woodland. It also occupies thickets with termite mounds, vegetation along drainage lines and edges of cultivated areas. The nest is a compact ball shape with a side entrance, built of dry grass and leaves reinforced with spider web. It is typically placed very near the ground in a grass tuft or small shrub.

Diet

It mainly eats insects, foraging unobtrusively in grass tufts and on the ground. The following food items have been recorded in its diet:
Insects such as termites, grasshoppers (Orthoptera), beetles (Coleoptera) and bugs (Hemiptera).

Breeding
In Zimbabwe the egg-laying season is from November–March. 
It lays 2-4 eggs, which are incubated solely by the female for about 14 days. 
The chicks stay in the nest for about 17 days.

References

External links
 Short-winged cisticola - Species text in The Atlas of Southern African Birds.

short-winged cisticola
Birds of Sub-Saharan Africa
short-winged cisticola
Taxonomy articles created by Polbot